David Satcher, (born March 2, 1941) is an American physician, and public health administrator. He was a four-star admiral in the United States Public Health Service Commissioned Corps and served as the 10th Assistant Secretary for Health, and the 16th Surgeon General of the United States.

Biography

Early years
Satcher was born in Anniston, Alabama. At the age of two, he contracted whooping cough. A Black doctor, Dr. Jackson, came to his parents' farm, and told his parents he didn't expect David to live, but nonetheless spent the day with him and told his parents how to give him the best chance he could. Satcher said that he grew up hearing that story, and that inspired him to be a doctor. While in college, Satcher was active in the Civil Rights Movement and was arrested on multiple occasions.

Satcher graduated from Morehouse College in Atlanta in 1963 and was elected to Phi Beta Kappa. He received his MD and a PhD in cell biology from Case Western Reserve University in 1970 with election to the Alpha Omega Alpha honor society. He completed his residency and fellowship training at the Strong Memorial Hospital, the University of Rochester, the UCLA School of Medicine, and Martin Luther King Jr.-Harbor Hospital. He is a fellow of the American Academy of Family Physicians, the American College of Preventive Medicine, and the American College of Physicians, and is board certified in preventive medicine. Satcher pledged Omega Psi Phi fraternity and is an initiate of the Psi chapter of Morehouse College.

Career

Satcher served as professor and Chairman of the Department of Community Medicine and Family Practice at Morehouse School of Medicine from 1979 to 1982. He is a former faculty member of the UCLA School of Medicine, the UCLA School of Public Health, and the King-Drew Medical Center in Los Angeles, where he developed and chaired the King-Drew Department of Family Medicine. From 1975 to 1979, he served as the interim Dean of the Charles R. Drew Postgraduate Medical School, during which time, he negotiated the agreement with UCLA School of Medicine and the Board of Regents that led to a medical education program at King-Drew. He also directed the King-Drew Sickle Cell Research Center for six years. Satcher served as President of Meharry Medical College in Nashville, Tennessee, from 1982 to 1993. He also held the posts of Director of the Centers for Disease Control and Prevention and Administrator of the Agency for Toxic Substances and Disease Registry from 1993 to 1998.

Chronic Fatigue Syndrome Scandal

Under Satcher's leadership, the CDC took millions of dollars Congress set aside for Chronic Fatigue Syndrome (CFS) research and secretly spent the funds in other areas. The misappropriation of funds continued for three years (from 1995-1998) and the CDC attempted to cover up their actions. The issue only came to light after a CDC employee filed a whistleblower report and a special Inspector General was appointed to investigate the matter. In the words of Martha Katz, Deputy Director for Policy and Legislation at CDC: "Resources intended for CFS were actually used for measles, polio and other disease areas. This was a breach of CDC's solemn trust and is in direct conflict with its core values." Despite the fact that millions of Americans suffer from CFS, Satcher's administration ignored the severity of the illness and engaged in misconduct that set back CFS research 5-6 years. Satcher has not issued a formal apology for the harm caused by his administration.

Surgeon General 

Satcher served simultaneously in the positions of Surgeon General and Assistant Secretary for Health from February 1998 through January 2001 at the US Department of Health and Human Services.  As such, he is the first Surgeon General to be appointed as a four-star admiral in the PHSCC, to reflect his dual offices.

In his first year as Surgeon General, Satcher released the 1998 Surgeon General's report "Tobacco Use Among U.S. Racial/Ethnic Minority Groups."  In it he reported that tobacco use was on the rise among youth in each of the country's major racial and ethnic groups, threatening their long-term health prospects.

Satcher was appointed by Bill Clinton, and remained Surgeon General until 2002, contemporaneously with the first half of the first term of President George W. Bush's administration. Eve Slater would later replace him as Assistant Secretary for Health in 2001. Because he no longer held his dual office, Satcher was reverted and downgraded to the grade of vice admiral in the regular corps for the remainder of his term as Surgeon General. In 2001, his office released the report, The Call to Action to Promote Sexual Health and Responsible Sexual Behavior. The report was hailed by the chairman of the American Academy of Family Physicians as an overdue paradigm shift—"The only way we're going to change approaches to sexual behavior and sexual activity is through school. In school, not only at the doctor's office." However, conservative political groups denounced the report as being too permissive towards homosexuality and condom distribution in schools. When Satcher left office, he retired with the rank of vice admiral.

Post–Surgeon General 
Upon his departure from the post, Satcher became a fellow at the Kaiser Family Foundation. In the fall of 2002, he assumed the post of Director of the National Center for Primary Care at the Morehouse School of Medicine.

On December 20, 2004, Satcher was named interim president at Morehouse School of Medicine until John E. Maupin, Jr., former president of Meharry Medical College assumed the current position on February 26, 2006. In June 2006, Satcher established the Satcher Health Leadership Institute (SHLI) at Morehouse School of Medicine as a natural extension of his experiences improving public health policy for all Americans and his commitment to eliminating health disparities for minorities, the poor, and other disadvantaged groups.

In 2013, he co-founded the advocacy group African American Network Against Alzheimer's.

As of 2002, he sits on the boards of Johnson & Johnson and, as of 2007, MetLife.

Criticisms of health inequality 
While acknowledging progress, Satcher has criticized health disparities. He asked the question, “What if we had eliminated disparities in health in the last century?” and calculated that there would have been 83,500 fewer Black deaths in the year 2000. That would have included 24,000 fewer Black deaths from cardiovascular disease. If infant mortality had been equal across racial and ethnic groups in 2000, 4,700 fewer Black infants would have died in their first year of life.

Without disparities, there would have been 22,000 fewer Black deaths from diabetes and almost 2,000 fewer Black women would have died from breast cancer; 250,000 fewer Blacks would have been infected with HIV/AIDS and 7,000 fewer Blacks would have died from complications due to AIDS in 2000. As many as 2.5 million additional Blacks, including 650,000 children, would have had health insurance in that year. He called on people to work for solutions at the individual, community, and policy level.

Satcher supports a Medicare-for-all style single payer health plan, in which insurance companies would be eliminated and the government would pay health care costs directly to doctors, hospitals and other providers through the tax system.

In 1990, while President of Meharry Medical College, Satcher founded a quarterly academic journal entitled the Journal of Health Care for the Poor and Underserved. Both the Kaiser Family Foundation and the Medical Library Association rate this journal as one of the nation's important public health journals.

Awards and honors 
He is the recipient of many honorary degrees and numerous distinguished honors, including the Public Health Service Distinguished Service Medal, the 2013 UC Berkeley School of Public Health Public Health Heroes Award, an honorary Doctor of Science from Harvard University (2011), an honorary Doctor of Public Health from Dickinson College (2016), and top awards from the American Medical Association, the American College of Physicians, the American Academy of Family Physicians, and Ebony magazine. In 1995, he received the Breslow Award in Public Health and in 1997 the New York Academy of Medicine Lifetime Achievement Award. In 2004, he received the Benjamin E. Mays Trailblazer Award and the Jimmy and Rosalynn Carter Award for Humanitarian Contributions to the Health of Humankind from the National Foundation for Infectious Diseases.  An academic society at the Case Western School of Medicine is named in Dr. Satcher's honor, and, in 2009, he delivered the university's Commencement Address.

References

External links 
 Morehouse School of Medicine Faculty Profile
 
 Satcher Interview on Healthcare as a Civil Rights Issue with Al Sharpton and Dr. V on AskDoctorv.com

 Misuse of Chronic Fatigue Syndrome Research Monies by CDC Admitted

1941 births
Living people
People from Anniston, Alabama
Case Western Reserve University alumni
Morehouse School of Medicine faculty
Johnson & Johnson people
Meharry Medical College
Surgeons General of the United States
Clinton administration personnel
African-American physicians
American Academy of Family Physicians members
United States Public Health Service Commissioned Corps admirals
Directors of the Centers for Disease Control and Prevention
George W. Bush administration personnel
Recipients of the Public Health Service Distinguished Service Medal
Morehouse College alumni
American biologists
Members of the National Academy of Medicine